Wu (Old Chinese: *) was one of the states during the Western Zhou dynasty and the Spring and Autumn period. It was also known as Gouwu ( /*/) or Gongwu ( /*/) from the pronunciation of the local language.

Wu was located at the mouth of the Yangtze River east of the State of Chu. Its first capital was at Meili (probably in modern Wuxi) and was later moved to Gusu (姑蘇, modern Suzhou) and then Helu City (the old town of present-day Suzhou).

History
A founding myth of Wu, first recorded by Sima Qian in the Han dynasty, traced its royal lineage to Taibo, a relative of King Wen of Zhou. According to the Records of the Grand Historian, Taibo was the oldest son of Gugong Danfu and the elder uncle of King Wen who started the Zhou Dynasty. Gugong Danfu had three sons named Taibo, Zhongyong, and Jili. Taibo was the oldest of three brothers, Jili being the youngest. Realizing that his youngest brother, Jili, was favored by his father to inherit the throne of Predynastic Zhou, the older brothers Taibo and Zhongyong left Zhou to avoid conflict and settled southeast to Wu with a group of followers loyal to him and his brother Zhongyong. They established their first capital at Meili, believed to be today's Meicun in Wuxi. Taibo's youngest brother Jili who was eventually the heir of the throne became the father of King Wen, who is attributed to starting the Zhou dynasty.

Little is known about the history of Wu before the Spring and Autumn period. Wu rose to power in the 6th century BC, after it was aided by the State of Jin as a useful ally against the State of Chu.

In 584 BC, Wu rebelled against Chu upon the advice of Wuchen, a Jin minister, who defected from Chu. From then on, Wu would become a constant threat to the Chu Kingdom. Wu planted seeds of rebellion amongst Chu's vassals along the Yangtze valley. Wu Zixu, a highly influential Chu politician's mother and brother was murdered by King Ping of Chu and fled to Wu plotting revenge. Wu Zixu later became a trusted advisor of Prince Guang and helped him assassinate his cousin King Liao of Wu and usurp the throne. After the successful assassination of King Liao, Prince Guang ascended the throne and became known as King Helü of Wu.

In 506 BC, during the reign of King Zhao of Chu, King Helü decided to invade Chu. The king personally led the army, along with his younger brother Fugai, Wu Zixu, as well as Sun Tzu, author of The Art of War. Although Chu had a strong army led by Nang Wa and Shen Yinshu, it suffered a heavy defeat at the Battle of Boju.  King Zhao of Chu fled to Sui and the Wu army captured Ying, Chu's capital. After entering Ying, Wu Zixu exhumed King Ping's corpse, and gave it 300 lashes to exact vengeance on for his mother and brother who were murdered by the Chu King.  The military victory led to Wu Zixu's elevation to Duke of Shen and his alias Shenxu. After these victories, Wu was briefly the most powerful nation and turned to other campaigns, defeating the State of Qi in 484 BC.

King Helü of Wu is considered to be one of the Five Hegemons of China during the Spring and Autumn period due to his military successes at this time with the help of his famous commander/strategist Sun Tzu.  Wu is also generally regarded as developing the first Chinese Navy.  This Navy was quite complex and had different classes of ships.  These "classes" of ships were the great wing (da yi), the little wing (xiao yi), the stomach striker (tu wei), the castle ship (lou chuan), and the bridge ship (qiao chuan). These were listed in the Yuejueshu (Lost Records of the State of Yue) as a written dialogue between King Helü of Wu (r. 514 BC–496 BC) and Wu Zixu (526 BC–484 BC) in which the latter stated:

Nowadays in training naval forces we use the tactics of land forces for the best effect. Thus great wing ships correspond to the army's heavy chariots, little wing ships to light chariots, stomach strikers to battering rams, castle ships to mobile assault towers, and bridge ships to light cavalry.

Ironically, Wu was later threatened by an upstart state to its own south, Yue; Chu then aided Yue's rise as a counter to Wu. Although Wu won majority of battles against the Yue and captured their King Goujian, Wu failed to completely subjugate Yue, in part because of Fuchai's willingness to let King Goujian live in Wu as his servant. King Goujian suffered for years as Fuchai's servant/slave and planned his revenge. Fuchai under the promise of peace, let Goujian return to Yue, his homeland which later proved to be a fatal mistake for Wu. While Wu was engaged in a military campaign in the north, Goujian enacted his revenge and launched a surprise attack on Wu in 482 BC and conquered the capital. Over the next decade, Wu was unable to recover and Yue absorbed the state in 473 BC.

Wu, Yue, and Chu all proclaimed themselves kings in the 6th century BC, showing the drastic weakening of the Zhou court's authority during the Spring and Autumn period.

Wu and Yue were masters of metallurgy, fabricating excellent swords with incised messages, geometric patterns, and inlaid gold or silver. Wu and Yue swords tend to use much more tin than copper compared to those of other states. Wu often sent swords as gifts to northern states, such as Qi and Cai. Examples include the spearhead of King Fuchai and the sword of Prince Guang.

Kings of Wu family tree
Chinese historical texts linked the kings of Wu to Taibo, the uncle of King Wen of Zhou. Their ancestral name was Ji and their clan name was Gufa. The last king of Wu, King Fuchai had at least four sons, three of whom were named You, Hong and Hui. You was his heir but was killed in one of the battles leading to the defeat of Wu, and Hong became the new heir. After the collapse of the state, the other three sons of Fuchai were exiled. Themselves, their blood relatives and descendants took Wu as their clan name in honor of their fallen kingdom.

Culture
The Records of the Grand Historian states that the people in Wu wore their hair short and sported tattoos. For Sima Qian this would have illustrated their supposed barbarism, as in his time Chinese men and women were not allowed to cut their hair or otherwise modify their body - doing so was considered an offence against the ancestors from which one had inherited one's physical features.

Wu rulers did not receive posthumous names after death.

Literature
The famed military strategist Sun Tzu, renowned for his military treatise The Art of War, served as a general under King Helü of Wu.

Language
The rulers of Wu are said to be descendants of early Zhou, however the indigenous language of the Wu region is distinct from Old Chinese spoken by central Chinese states. Historians have attempted to link the language with Austronesian languages, Kra–Dai or a distinct Sino-Tibetan language.

Legacy
"Wu" continues to be used as a name for the region around Suzhou and Shanghai and their regional speech, Wu Chinese. It was employed by other states and princes holding power in the region, most notably Eastern Wu of the Three Kingdoms, and Wu and Wuyue of the Ten Kingdoms.

Connections with Japan
Ambassadorial visits to Japan by the later Chinese dynasties Wei and Jin recorded that the Wajin of Japan claimed to be descendants of Taibo of Wu, traditionally believed to be the mythical founder of Wu. Several scholars suggest that the Yamato people and the Imperial House of Japan are descendants of the Wu and possibly Taibo. Many Japanese historians also link the early Japanese Yayoi people to the Baiyue tribes.

Wu in astronomy
Wu, together with Yue, is represented with the star Zeta Aquilae in asterism Left Wall, Heavenly Market enclosure (see Chinese constellations).

See also
King of Wu
Wu Zixu
Yue

References

Further reading
Wagner, Donald B. 1990. The language of the ancient Chinese state of Wu. East Asian institute Occasional paper 6. University of Copenhagen.
 Needham, Joseph (1986). Science and Civilization in China: Volume 4, Physics and Physical Technology, Part 3, Civil Engineering and Nautics. Taipei: Caves Books Ltd.
Zhengzhang Shangfang 1990. "Some Kam-Tai Words in Place Names of the Ancient Wu and Yue States" [古吴越地名中的侗台语成份]. In Minzu Yuwen 6. 
Zhengzhang Shangfang 鄭張尚芳. "Gu Yueyu" 古越語 [The old Yue language]. In Dong Chuping 董楚平 et al. Wu Yue wenhua zhi 吳越文化誌 [Record of the cultures of Wu and Yue]. Shanghai: Shanghai renmin chubanshe, 1998, vol. 1, pp. 253–281. 

 
Ancient Chinese states
11th-century BC establishments in China
History of Jiangsu
History of Shanghai
473 BC
5th-century BC disestablishments in China